The Thlewiaza River is a river in Canada. Although some sources define the river as originating out of Nueltin Lake, according to the Canadian Geographical Names Database the river begins at Snyder Lake in northwestern Manitoba. From there the river flows northeast through Kasmere Lake into the southwest end of Nueltin Lake.

The river's name in Chipewyan is Łuazedes (pronounced thlu-assee-des), meaning "little fish river", in reference to the plentiful grayling in its waters. It is known to the Inuit as the "big river" and used by them to travel inland where they trap arctic foxes and hunt caribou. A sighting of harbour seals at Edehon Lake has been documented and sightings further upstream at Nueltin Lake have also been reported.

The Thlewiaza was first mapped in 1912 by Ernest Oberholtzer and Billy Magee, an Ojibwe trapper. There are no permanent settlements in the area.

References

Rivers of Kivalliq Region
Rivers of Manitoba